The 2000 4 Nations Cup was the fifth playing of the annual women's ice hockey tournament. It was held in Provo, Utah, from November 7–11, 2000. As Sweden joined the tournament, it became the 4 Nations Cup.

Results

Final Table

Final

3rd place

External links
Tournament on hockeyarchives.info

2000
2000–01 in American women's ice hockey
2000–01 in Finnish ice hockey
2000–01 in Swedish ice hockey
2000–01 in Canadian women's ice hockey
2000-01
2000–01 in women's ice hockey
November 2000 sports events in the United States
2000 in sports in Utah